James Mackie Deas (1891 – 27 January 1963) was a New Zealand politician of the Labour Party.

Biography

Early life and career
Deas was born in Leslie, Fife, Scotland, in 1891. He served in World War I as a member of the Black Watch and later worked for the Ministry of Pensions before moving to New Zealand in 1926. He settled in Papatoetoe and became a district newspaper correspondent for The New Zealand Herald.

He was secretary of the Otahuhu Unemployment Committee during the Great Depression. Deas then became a publisher for several suburban newspapers in South Auckland before joining the reporting staff of The New Zealand Herald during World War II. He moved to Wellington and spent four years as a journalist in the Parliamentary Press Gallery.

Political career

Following the war Deas moved back to Auckland and was elected Mayor of Otahuhu from 1950 to 1954. He was also a member of the Otahuhu High School Committee and chairman of the Otahuhu District School Committee. In addition he was President of the Otahuhu Free Kindergarten. In 1953, he was awarded the Queen Elizabeth II Coronation Medal.

He won the Otahuhu electorate in 1954 and represented it until 1963, when he died. During the Second Labour Government Deas became quite critical of Prime Minister Walter Nash in caucus, thinking him too preoccupied with matters pertaining to foreign affairs and going as far as accusing him of ignoring domestic affairs. His sentiments were shared by many other MPs.

Death
Deas caught a severe bronchial chill in London whilst travelling from the 1962 Commonwealth Parliamentary Association conference in Lagos. He died suddenly at Middlemore Hospital on 27 January 1963, aged 71. He was survived by his wife and two sons.

The resulting  when he died was won by Bob Tizard.

Notes

References

1891 births
1963 deaths
British emigrants to New Zealand
British Army personnel of World War I
Mayors of places in the Auckland Region
New Zealand Labour Party MPs
Members of the New Zealand House of Representatives
New Zealand MPs for Auckland electorates
Unsuccessful candidates in the 1951 New Zealand general election
Deaths from bronchitis